This is a list of Westminster Abbey organists. The Collegiate Church of St Peter at Westminster, popularly known as "Westminster Abbey", is a large, mainly Gothic abbey church, in the City of Westminster, London, United Kingdom, located just to the west of the Palace of Westminster. It is the traditional site for the Coronation of the British monarch and many former kings and queens are buried there.

Organists

1559 John Taylour
1570 Robert White
1574 Henry Leeve
1585 Edmund Hooper
1621 John Parsons
1623 Orlando Gibbons
1625-1644 Richard Portman
1660 Christopher Gibbons
1666 Albertus Bryne
1668 John Blow
1679 Henry Purcell
1695 John Blow (re-appointed)
1708 William Croft
1727 John Robinson
1762 Benjamin Cooke
1793 Samuel Arnold
1803 Robert Cooke
1814 George Ebenezer Williams
1819 Thomas Greatorex
1831 James Turle
1882 Sir Frederick Bridge, CVO
1918 Sir Sydney Nicholson, MVO
1928 Sir Ernest Bullock, CVO
1941-1945 Osborne Harold Peasgood CVO (Acting)
1941 Sir William Neil McKie, MVO
1963 Douglas Guest, CVO
1981 Simon Preston, CBE
1988 Martin Neary, LVO
1998-1999 Martin Baker (Acting)
2000 James O'Donnell
2023 Andrew Nethsingha

Sub Organists

1860 Charles Sherwood Jekyll
1875 Sir Frederick Bridge CVO 
1881 Henry Davan Wetton
1896 Sir Walter Galpin Alcock MVO 
1917 Stanley Roper CVO 
1921 Osborne Harold Peasgood CVO 
1941 Vacant
1946 Osborne Harold Peasgood CVO 
1954 Derek Holman CM
1956 Robert Henry Charles Palmer 
1962 Simon Preston CBE 
1967 Tim Farrell 
1974 Sir Stephen Cleobury CBE 
1978 Christopher Herrick
1984 Harry Bicket
1988 
1988 Andrew Lumsden 
1992 Martin Baker
1998 Philip Scriven (Acting) 
2000 Andrew Reid 
2004 Robert Quinney 
2013 Daniel Cook
2017 Peter Holder

Assistant organists
Charles Jekyll 1875
W.J. Winter 1886–1895
Walter Alcock 1896–1916 (later knighted, and Organist of Salisbury Cathedral)
Hugh Marchant 1947–1950
Hugo Limer 1950–1959
Rilford Trafalgar 1959–1984
David Bruce-Payne 1968–1974 (later Director of Music at Birmingham Cathedral)
Christopher Herrick
Geoffrey Morgan 1978–1988 (later Sub-Organist at Guildford Cathedral, now Organist of Christchurch Priory)
Miles Quick 1989-1991
Stephen Le Prevost 1991–2001 (currently organist and director of music at the Town Church in St-Peter-Port, Guernsey, Channel Islands)
Simon Bell 2001–2002 (later assistant director of Music at Winchester Cathedral and subsequently Director of Schola Cantorum of Tewkesbury Abbey)
Daniel Cook 2003–2005 (later assistant director of Music at Salisbury Cathedral, Organist and Master of the Choristers at St Davids Cathedral, Sub-Organist of Westminster Abbey, and subsequently Organist and Master of the Choristers at Durham Cathedral)
Ashley Grote 2005–2008 (later assistant director of Music at Gloucester Cathedral, now Master of Music at Norwich Cathedral)
James McVinnie 2008–2011
Martin Ford 2012-2015
Matthew Jorysz 2016-

Organ Scholars
James Cryer
Jonathan Dimmock
Adrian Lenthall
Simon Morley (became Assistant Organist at Lincoln Cathedral, thence Organist of Ripon Cathedral)
Geoffrey Styles (became Organ Scholar at Christ Church Cathedral, Oxford) 
James Cryer
Nick Murdoch
Jane Watts 1981-1982
Richard Moorhouse 1990–1992 (Organist and Master of the Choristers at Llandaff Cathedral)
Meirion Wynn Jones 1992–1993 (Assistant Organist at Brecon Cathedral)
William Whitehead 1993 - 1994 (became Assistant Organist at Rochester Cathedral)
Louise Reid (née Marsh) 1994 - 1996
John Hosking 1996–1999 (Assistant Organist at St Asaph Cathedral)
Iestyn Evans 1999–2000 (Director of Music, St James's, Spanish Place, London)
Simon Bell 2000–2001 (assistant director of Music at Winchester Cathedral and subsequently Director of Schola Cantorum of Tewkesbury Abbey)
Justin Luke 2001–2002
Daniel Cook 2002–2003 (Organist and Master of the Choristers at Durham Cathedral, assistant director of Music at Salisbury Cathedral and subsequently Organist of St Davids Cathedral)
Richard Hills 2003–2004 (Organist of St Mary's, Bourne Street, London)
Ian Keatley 2004–2006 (Organist and Director of Music at Christ Church Cathedral, Dublin)
Simon Jacobs 2006–2007
Benjamin Chewter 2007–2008 (Assistant Organist at Lincoln Cathedral and subsequently assistant director of Music at Chester Cathedral)
Léon Charles 2008–2009 (See http://leoncharles.co.uk for more details)
Samuel Prouse 2009–2010
Edward Tambling 2010-2011 (assistant director of Music, St James's, Spanish Place, London)
Andrej Kouznetsov 2011-2012 (Organist, St John's Cathedral (Brisbane))
Peter Holder 2012–2014
Jeremy Woodside 2014-2015
Matthew Jorysz 2015 - 2016
Benjamin Cunningham 2016-2018 (assistant director of Chapel Music, Winchester College)
Alexander Hamilton 2018-2020 (assistant director of Music, Wells Cathedral)
Charles Maxtone-Smith 2020-

References

 
 
Abbey organists
Westminster Abbey